Helena Maria Ferreira Fernandes (born 19 October 1967) is a Brazilian actress.

Career 
Fernandes has lent her face as a model for several characters of Brazilian television. He began his career in a small role in the soap opera of Carlos Lombardi, Quatro por Quatro. Success, however, came a little later in the soap opera Quem É Você? By Ivani Ribeiro, where he played the bitter Nadia. Due to the high profile of the actress, was invited to join the team in the series Caça Talentos, where he gave life to Silvana, the main antagonist.

Used to playing villains, as noted in Sítio do Picapau Amarelo and Canavial de Paixões in 2005 gave a chance for comedy portraying the character of Ipanema de Jesus show A Diarista. The character was so successful that the cameo character became fixed.

With the end of the diarist, in 2007, made a cameo in Malhação in the same year. In 2008, invited by author Andréa Maltarolli, joined the cast of Beleza Pura, where he lived Marcia, a journalist who formed a pentagon love with the characters of Antonio Calloni, Guilherme Fontes, Soraya Ravenle and Reginaldo Faria.

Also in 2008, participated in a series of episodes of Faça Sua História. In 2009, invited by Glória Barreto and Maria Mariana, went back to the cast of Malhação, this time playing a completely different role than that played the other time: in 2007, interpreted the "station wagon" Scarleth, Bruna Capettini helper (Gabriella Vigolo ) in 2009, Ursula lived, the mother of unscrupulous Caius, the villain played by Humberto Carrão.

With the end of 2009 season of Malhação came to climb to the then novel 19h of the Globe, Tempos Modernos, in which he played Luciana, but such participation does not just occur, since neither the character nor the actress entered the plot. In 2011, Insensato Coração was cast by Gilberto Braga and Ricardo Linhares.

In the film, in the films Se Eu Fosse Você and Adrift, participated in the dubbing of the movie The Incredibles, and was specially invited by Delart to dub version of Alice in Wonderland produced by Tim Burton.

Personal life 

She is married to director José Alvarenga Júnior and mother to Yan, Antônio and Lucas.

Filmography

Television

Film

References

External links 

1967 births
Living people
Actresses from Rio de Janeiro (city)
Brazilian television actresses
Brazilian telenovela actresses
Brazilian film actresses
Brazilian stage actresses